Alice Fischer (January 16, 1869 – June 25, 1947) was an American stage actress born in Indiana. Her one film appearance was the now lost 1917 National Red Cross Pageant. 

She made her stage debut in 1887 in a play called Nordeck.  Her Broadway debut was on 3 December 1888 at the Broadway Theatre, playing Minna in Little Lord Fauntleroy. In 1892 she played Agrippina in a production of Nero at the Fourteenth Street Theatre. In 1893 she toured with legendary Joseph Jefferson.

She founded the Twelfth Night Club in New York and was the President of the organization for over 20 years.  She married Shakespearian actor William Harcourt King (1866-1923) on May 7, 1893.

Gallery

References

External links

Alice Fischer portraits(NY Public Library, Billy Rose collection)

1869 births
1947 deaths
Actresses from Indiana
Actors from Terre Haute, Indiana
20th-century American actresses